Pontito is administratively a frazione of the comune of Pescia, in the Province of Pistoia, Tuscany.

Location and description
It is one of the localities called Dieci castella (Ten castles) of the Valleriana area, otherwise called  ("Switzerland of Pescia"). It is located in the northernmost part of the Valleriana area. Pontito is an ancient village with its old stone houses in an almost total solitude, perched on a hill of 745 meters above sea level. The village is famous for is bell shape, obtained in accordance with the characteristics of the hill on which it has arisen. The bell shape widens as the altitude diminishes. In all likelihood the origins of the village are early medieval, making it one of the oldest and most iconic villages of the area.

Etymology 
According to tradition, the name should be traced to a bridge built here by the Roman emperor Titus. A more probable hypothesis binds the name of the village to a saint named Pontito. Another hypothesis is to derive the name from the village's characteristic pointed shape, defined as appuntito ("pointed"), which then became the current name of the village.

Monuments and places of interest

Gallery of images

References

External links

Chiesa SS. Andrea e Lucia, Pontito tripadvisor.com
Frazioni di Pescia

Frazioni of the Province of Pistoia